The 2008 Summer Olympics, officially known as the Games of the XXIX Olympiad, were a summer multi-sport event held in Beijing, the capital of the People's Republic of China, from 8 to 24 August 2008. Approximately 10,942 athletes from 204 National Olympic Committees (NOCs) participated in 302 events in 28 sports.

Athletes from 87 countries won medals, and 55 of them won at least one gold medal. Both of these categories set new records until surpassed in 2016. Athletes from China won the most gold medals, with 48, while athletes from the United States won the most total medals, with 112. Afghanistan, Mauritius, Sudan, Tajikistan and Togo won their first Olympic medals. Athletes from Mongolia (which previously held the record for most medals without a gold) and Panama won their first gold medals. Serbian swimmer Milorad Čavić won the first medal for the country as an independent NOC. Serbian athletes had previously won medals as nationals of Yugoslavia and Serbia and Montenegro. Samoa won its first Olympic medal due to medals reallocation after the IOC retested doping samples in 2016.

Medal table

The ranking in this table is based on information provided by the International Olympic Committee (IOC) and is consistent with IOC convention in its published medal tables. By default, the table is ordered by the number of gold medals the athletes from a nation have won (in this context, a "nation" is an entity represented by a National Olympic Committee). The number of silver medals is taken into consideration next and then the number of bronze medals. If nations are still tied, equal ranking is given and they are listed alphabetically by IOC country code.

In boxing, judo, taekwondo and wrestling, two bronze medals are awarded in each weight class. Therefore, the total number of bronze medals is greater than the total number of gold or silver medals. An exception was the men's 84 kg Greco-Roman wrestling, where Ara Abrahamian was stripped of his medal due to his conduct during the medal ceremony. Additionally there was a tie for the silver medal in the women's 100 metres in athletics and no bronze was awarded. Ties for third in swimming's men's 100 metre backstroke and men's 100 metre freestyle meant that two bronze medals were awarded for those events.

Key
 Changes in medal standings (see below)

Changes in medal standings

Belarusian athletes Vadim Devyatovskiy and Ivan Tsikhan, who won silver and bronze respectively in the men's hammer throw, both tested positive for abnormal levels of testosterone. After attending a disciplinary hearing in September 2008, they were stripped of their medals on 11 December 2008. Krisztián Pars of Hungary was awarded the silver medal, and Koji Murofushi of Japan was awarded the bronze. However, both of the Belarusian athletes subsequently had their medals reinstated because the doping tests were not handled correctly.

See also 

 All-time Olympic Games medal table
 2008 Summer Paralympics medal table

References

External links
 
 
 
 Beijing 2008 Overall Medal Standings (original results archived on 1 October 2008)

Medal table
Summer Olympics medal tables